Sassenage is a commune in the Isère department in southeastern France. It is part of the Grenoble urban unit (agglomeration).

Population

International relations
Sassenage is twinned with:
 Meßkirch, Germany
 Sasso Marconi, Italy

See also
Parc naturel régional du Vercors
Communes of the Isère department

References

External links
Official site

Communes of Isère
Isère communes articles needing translation from French Wikipedia